In mathematical finite group theory, the Baer–Suzuki theorem, proved by  and ,  states that if any two elements of a conjugacy class C of a finite group generate a nilpotent subgroup, then all elements of the conjugacy class C are contained in a nilpotent subgroup.  gave a short elementary proof.

References

Theorems about finite groups